A group is a set together with an associative operation which admits an identity element and such that every element has an inverse.

Throughout the article, we use  to denote the identity element of a group.

A

C

D

F

G

H

I

L

N

O

P

Q

R

S

T

Basic definitions

Subgroup.

Both subgroups and normal subgroups of a given group form a complete lattice under inclusion of subsets; this property and some related results are described by the lattice theorem.

Group homomorphism. These are functions  that have the special property that

Kernel of a group homomorphism. It is the preimage of the identity in the codomain of a group homomorphism.  Every normal subgroup is the kernel of a group homomorphism and vice versa.

Group isomorphism. Group homomorphisms that have inverse functions. The inverse of an isomorphism, it turns out, must also be a homomorphism.

Isomorphic groups.  Two groups are isomorphic if there exists a group isomorphism mapping from one to the other. Isomorphic groups can be thought of as essentially the same, only with different labels on the individual elements.
One of the fundamental problems of group theory is the classification of groups up to isomorphism.

Direct product, direct sum, and semidirect product of groups. These are ways of combining groups to construct new groups; please refer to the corresponding links for explanation.

Types of groups

Finitely generated group. If there exists a finite set  such that  then  is said to be finitely generated. If  can be taken to have just one element,  is a cyclic group of finite order, an infinite cyclic group, or possibly a group  with just one element.

Simple group. Simple groups are those groups having only  and themselves as normal subgroups. The name is misleading because a simple group can in fact be very complex. An example is the monster group, whose order is about 1054. Every finite group is built up from simple groups via group extensions, so the study of finite simple groups is central to the study of all finite groups. The finite simple groups are known and classified.

The structure of any finite abelian group is relatively simple; every finite abelian group is the direct sum of cyclic p-groups.
This can be extended to a complete classification of all finitely generated abelian groups, that is all abelian groups that are generated by a finite set.

The situation is much more complicated for the non-abelian groups.

Free group. Multiplication of strings is defined by concatenation, for instance 

Please refer to presentation of a group for more explanation.
One can then ask algorithmic questions about these presentations, such as:
 Do these two presentations specify isomorphic groups?; or
 Does this presentation specify the trivial group?
The general case of this is the word problem, and several of these questions are in fact unsolvable by any general algorithm.

General linear group, denoted by GL(n, F), is the group of -by- invertible matrices, where the elements of the matrices are taken from a field  such as the real numbers or the complex numbers.

Group representation (not to be confused with the presentation of a group).  A group representation is a homomorphism from a group to a general linear group.  One basically tries to "represent" a given abstract group as a concrete group of invertible matrices which is much easier to study.

See also
Glossary of Lie groups and Lie algebras
Glossary of ring theory
Composition series
Normal series

 
Group theory
Wikipedia glossaries using description lists